Gymnasura pallida is a moth of the subfamily Arctiinae. It was described by Rothschild in 1913. It is found in New Guinea.

References

 Natural History Museum Lepidoptera generic names catalog

Nudariina
Moths described in 1913
Moths of New Guinea